Minuscule 747 (in the Gregory-Aland numbering), A220 (von Soden), is a Greek minuscule manuscript of the New Testament written on parchment. It is dated by a Colophon to 1164 CE. The manuscript has complex contents. Scrivener labelled it as 741e.

Description 

The codex contains a complete text of the four Gospels on 376 parchment leaves (size ). The text is written in one column per page, 9-25 lines per page for biblical text, and 47 lines per page for a commentary's text.

There is also another division according to the smaller Ammonian Sections (Mark 241 sections, the last section in 16:20), with references to the Eusebian Canons (written below Ammonian Section numbers).

Lectionary markings at the margin were added by a later hand.

It has a commentary, John 6:19-21:25 has not a commentary.

Text 

Aland the Greek text of the codex did not place in any Category.

According to the Claremont Profile Method it represents textual family Kx in Luke 10 and Luke 20. In Luke 1 it has mixed Byzantine text.

History 

According to the colophon the manuscript was written in 1164. In that way Scrivener and von Soden deciphered colophon. Gregory deciphered it as 1164 or 1169. According to Hermann von Soden the colophon could be added by a later hand.

The manuscript was added to the list of New Testament manuscripts by Scrivener (741) and Gregory (747). It was examined and described by Paulin Martin. Gregory saw the manuscript in 1885.

The manuscript was examined by Kirsopp Lake.

The manuscript is now housed at the Bibliothèque nationale de France (Suppl. Gr. 612) in Paris.

See also 

 List of New Testament minuscules
 Biblical manuscript
 Textual criticism
 Minuscule 746

References

Further reading 

 

Greek New Testament minuscules
12th-century biblical manuscripts
Bibliothèque nationale de France collections